Victoria Gardens is a shopping centre located in Richmond, Victoria, Australia approximately  east of Melbourne's central business district. It is located on the corner of Victoria and Burnley Streets, Richmond at the eastern end of the Richmond commercial, retail and residential precinct.

History
Victoria Gardens was officially opened on 3 April 2003. It occupies the site of the former Vickers Ruwolt engineering works which manufactured large industrial components and was the location of some iconic photography by Wolfgang Sievers. The site was an undeveloped "bomb site" for nearly 20 years prior to the construction of the centre. Victoria Gardens shopping centre is part of the greater Victoria Gardens Precinct Development a joint venture by Salta Properties and Vicinity Centres.

Anchors
There are several major stores anchored in the centre, most notably an IKEA furniture store. Other major anchors include Coles and Kmart, while mini majors include Freedom, Rebel Sport, JB Hi-Fi, Chemist Warehouse and Daiso. The centre also comprises a large food court to go along with a Hoyts cinema complex and a fresh food market located near Coles.

Transport
Victoria Gardens is accessible by tram route 12 (which terminates there) and route 109.

References

External links

Shopping centres in Melbourne
Shopping malls established in 2003
Buildings and structures in the City of Yarra
2003 establishments in Australia